Infatuation is a lost 1915 silent film directed by Harry A. Pollard and starring his wife Margarita Fischer. It was distributed through the Mutual Film Company.

Cast
Margarita Fischer - Phyllis Ladd
Harry A. Pollard - Cyril Adair
Joseph Singleton - John Ladd (*Joseph E. Singleton)
Lucille Ward - Mrs. Fenshaw

References

External links

1915 films
American silent feature films
American black-and-white films
Films directed by Harry A. Pollard
Mutual Film films
Lost American films
1915 drama films
Silent American drama films
1915 lost films
Lost drama films
1910s American films
1910s English-language films
English-language drama films